Samuel Sanders Teulon (2 March 1812 – 2 May 1873) was an English Gothic Revival architect, noted for his use of polychrome brickwork and the complex planning of his buildings.

Family
Teulon was born in 1812 in Greenwich, Kent, the son of a cabinet-maker from a French Huguenot family. His younger brother William Milford Teulon (1823–1900) also became an architect.

Career
He was articled to George Legg, and later worked as an assistant to the Bermondsey-based architect George Porter. He also studied in the drawing schools of the Royal Academy. He set up his own independent practice in 1838, and in 1840 won the competition to design some almshouses for the Dyers' Company at Ball's Pond, Islington. After this his practice expanded rapidly. During the next few years his works mainly consisted of parish schools, parsonages and similar buildings, mostly in the Home Counties.

He was a friend of George Gilbert Scott and became a member of the Council of the Royal Institute of British Architects on 6 January 1835.  Between 1841 and 1842 he undertook a long study tour of continental Europe with Ewan Christian who remained a lifelong friend and became his executor.  Also in company during the tour was Horace Jones who was later knighted and became architect to the Corporation of the City of London and Hayter Lewis, later Professor of Architecture at University College, London.

He built his first church, the Early English-style St Paul, Bermondsey, in 1846. Soon after this he designed St Stephen, Southwark, a building adapted to its square site by being planned in the form of a Greek cross, with the recessed angles filled in by the tower, vestry, chancel aisles. 
Teulon's religious views were Low Church, and his patrons were predominantly members of established aristocratic families who shared his outlook. In 1848 he received a commission from the 7th Duke of Bedford to design cottages for the Thorney estate, and the next year he built Tortworth Court, Gloucestershire, a substantial mansion in a kind of Neo-Tudor style, with a large central tower, for the Earl of Ducie. Other clients included John Sumner, archbishop of Canterbury, who commissioned Christ Church in Croydon; the Duke of Marlborough, for whom he refitted the chapel at Blenheim Palace in 1857-9; the 10th Duke of St Albans and Prince Albert.

His work included the remodelling of several unfashionable 18th-century churches to suit contemporary tastes. Archibald Tait, the Bishop of London, praised his alterations at St. Mary's, Ealing, as "the transformation of a Georgian monstrosity into the semblance of a Byzantine Basilica".

As well as Gothic Revival churches, he designed several country houses and even complete villages, as he did at Hunstanworth in County Durham in 1863.

Style
Despite his classical training, Teulon's early designs were mostly in imitation of Tudor and Elizabethan styles, and he soon became an enthusiastic follower of the latest developments of the Gothic Revival. He was an enthusiastic user of Polychrome brickwork. His planning was often elaborate: Henry-Russell Hitchcock called his mansion at Elvetham Park in Hampshire "so complex in its composition and so varied in its detailing that it quite defies description". Some of his later work was, however, more restrained: for instance at St Stephen's Church, Rosslyn Hill, Hampstead, (1869–76) the exterior is of purple-brown brick, of subtly varied tones with light stone trimming. The massing of the building is also simpler than in his earlier designs.

Death
For the last 20 years of his life until his death on 2 May 1873, Teulon lived in one of four Georgian mansions on Hampstead Green which were demolished at the start of the twentieth century to make way for Hampstead General Hospital, which was itself demolished in the 1970s and replaced by The Royal Free Hospital. Opposite his home he designed St Stephen's Church, Rosslyn Hill.  He is buried on the west side of Highgate Cemetery, not far from the family vault of his former neighbour on Hampstead Green, Rowland Hill.

His great great great nephew, Alan Teulon, published a book on S.S. Teulon in 
2009. He was survived by four sons and four daughters.

Works

St James's Vicarage, Chipping Campden, Gloucestershire; additional wing 1844 (now demolished)
St Mary's Rectory, North Creake, Norfolk; 1845
Holkham Hall, Norfolk, porch 1847 
St Paul's Parish Church, Bermondsey; 1848 (demolished 1961) 
All Saints' Parish Church, Icklesham, East Sussex; restoration 1848–49
Church of the Holy Spirit, Rye Harbour, East Sussex; 1848–49
Owlpen House, Owlpen, Gloucestershire; 1848 (demolished 1955-6, apart from the stables and lodge)
Thorney Model Village, Cambridgeshire; from 1848
St Mary's Parish Church, Pakenham, Suffolk; alterations 1849
Queen's Terrace, Windsor, Berkshire; 1849
St Paul's Church, Sandgate, Kent; 1849 
St Peter's Church, Great Birch, Essex; 1849–50 
Tortworth Court, Tortworth, Gloucestershire; 1849–52
St John's Parish Church, Rushford, Norfolk; restoration c.1850
St Mary's Parish Church, Benwick, Cambridgeshire; 1850 (now demolished)
St Mary's Parsonage, Grendon, Northamptonshire; 1850
St Mary's Church, Riseholme, Lincolnshire 1851
St John's Parish Church, Kingscote, Gloucestershire; restoration 1851
Christ Church, Croydon, Surrey; 1851–1852 (largely destroyed 1985)
Holy Trinity Parish Church, Hastings, East Sussex; rebuilding 1851–59
St Andrew's Parish Church, Brettenham, Norfolk; restorations and remodelling 1852 
St James' Church, Edgbaston, Birmingham; 1852
St Margaret's Parish Church, Angmering, West Sussex; restoration 1852–53
St John's Church, Ladywood, Birmingham; 1852–54
Estate cottages, Windsor, Berkshire; 1853
St Andrew's Church, Watford; 1853-57
School in Oxford Road, Woodstock, Oxfordshire; 1854
A cottage, Tortworth, Gloucestershire; 1854
Sandringham House, Norfolk, porch and conservatory 1854
Cholmondeley Castle, Cheshire; alterations 1854
Schoolmaster's house and chapel, Curridge, Berkshire; 1854–55
Christ Church Parish Church, Fosbury, Wiltshire; 1854–56
St Andrew's Parish Church, Lambeth, London; 1855
St Mary's Vicarage, Steeple Barton, Oxfordshire; 1856
St John the Baptist's Parish Church, Burringham, Lincolnshire; 1856–57
Gisborough Hall, Guisborough, North Yorkshire; 1857 (also attributed to William Milford Teulon)
St Mary's Parish Church, Sunbury, Surrey; internal alterations 1857
St Thomas's Church, Pearman Street, Lambeth; 1857 (demolished)  
Shadwell Court, Rushford, Norfolk; extensions & remodelling 1857–60
All Saints' Parish Church, Wordwell, Suffolk; restoration 1857 and 1866
St Giles's Parish Church, Uley, Gloucestershire; rebuilding 1857–58
St Mary's Parish Church, Alderbury, Wiltshire; 1857–58
Holy Trinity Parish Church, Oare, Wiltshire; 1857–58 - Pevsner considered it "the ugliest church in Wiltshire".
All Saints' Parish Church, Middleton Stoney, Oxfordshire; rebuilding 1858
St Bartholomew's Parish Church, Newington Bagpath, Gloucestershire; rebuilt chancel 1858
Browne's Charity Almshouses and Chapel, South Weald, Essex 1858
St James's Parish Church, Leckhampstead, Berkshire; 1858–60
Prince Albert's Workshops, Windsor Great Park, Berkshire; 1858–61
St Stephen's Parish Church, Manciple Street, Southwark; 1859 (demolished 1965)
St John the Baptist's Parish Church, Netherfield, East Sussex; 1859
Christ Church, Wimbledon, London; 1859–60
Elvetham Hall, Elvetham, Hampshire; 1859–60
Hawkleyhurst House, Hawkley, Hampshire; 1860
St Mary's Vicarage, Gainford, County Durham; 1860
St Silas' Church, Penton Street, Islington; 1860, completed 1863 by E.P. Loftus Brock
St Bartholomew's Parish Church, Nympsfield, Gloucestershire; rebuilt church 1861–63
St Mark's Parish Church, Silvertown, London; 1861–62 (now the Brick Lane Music Hall)
Huntley Manor, Huntley, Gloucestershire; 1862
Bestwood Lodge, Bestwood, Nottinghamshire; 1862–65
St John the Baptist's Parish Church, Huntley, Gloucestershire; 1863
Village of Hunstanworth, County Durham; 1863 
St Thomas's Parish Church, Agar Town, London; 1863 (now demolished)
All Saints Church, Benhilton, Sutton, London; 1863
St Mary's Parish Church, Woodchester, Gloucestershire; 1863–64
Royal Chapel of All Saints, Windsor Great Park, Berkshire; 1863–66
St Peter and St Paul's Parish Church, Hawkley, Hampshire; 1865
St Mary's Parish Church, Horsham, Sussex; south aisle 1865
Wrotham Park, Hertfordshire; alterations 1865
St George's Parish Church, Hanworth, Middlesex; spire 1865
Buxton Memorial Fountain in Victoria Tower Gardens, London; 1865
Tyndale Monument, North Nibley, Gloucestershire; 1866
St Paul's Parish Church, Greenwich; 1866
St Margaret's Parish Church, Hopton-on-Sea, Norfolk; 1866-7 
St Mary's Parish Church, Ealing, London; 1866–73
St Andrew's and St John's School, Roupell Street, Lambeth; c.1868
Lychgate to Church of St. Peter, South Weald, Essex 1868
Church of St. Peter, South Weald, Essex 1868
St Stephen's Parish Church, Rosslyn Hill, Hampstead, London; 1869-71
The Court House, St Andrew Holborn, London; 1870
St John the Baptist's Parish Church, Windsor, Berkshire; alterations 1869–73
Woodlands Vale, Ryde, Isle of Wight; 1870–71
St Frideswide's Parish Church, New Osney, Oxford; 1870–72
Holy Trinity Parish Church, Leicester; remodelling 1871
St Andrew's Parish Church, Eastern Green, Coventry; 1875
Embrook House, Sandgate, Kent; 1852 (demolished)
Riseholme Hall, Stable block (perhaps) Riseholme, Lincolnshire 1840–45

Gallery

References

Sources

 http://www.northamptonchron.co.uk/community/nostalgia/famous_ancestor_built_chapel_for_royal_family_1_3288582 self-published book by historian and great-great-great nephew of S.S. Teulon

External links

1812 births
1873 deaths
Burials at Highgate Cemetery
Gothic Revival architects
English ecclesiastical architects
People from Greenwich
Architects of cathedrals
Architects from Kent
19th-century English architects